The Charter for the Kingdom of the Netherlands (in Dutch: Statuut voor het Koninkrijk der Nederlanden; in Papiamentu: Statuut di Reino Hulandes) is a legal instrument that sets out the political relationship between the four countries that constitute the Kingdom of the Netherlands: Aruba, Curaçao, and Sint Maarten in the Caribbean and the Netherlands (for the most part) in Europe. It is the leading legal document of the Kingdom. The Constitution of the Netherlands and the Basic Laws of the three other countries are legally subordinate to the Charter.

History

The first version of the Charter, which described the relationship between the Netherlands, Suriname, and the Netherlands Antilles, was signed by Queen Juliana on 15 December 1954. This version lasted for a couple of decades until 25 November 1975, when Suriname became an independent republic.

In the Netherlands Antilles, the idea of one state never enjoyed the full support of all the islands, and Aruba seceded on 1 January 1986 as political relations between islands were strained. Aruba gained the same autonomous status as the Netherlands Antilles. The desire for secession had also been strong in Sint Maarten. The Netherlands Antilles was later completely dissolved, on 10 October 2010, when (following referendums) Curaçao and Sint Maarten became autonomous countries similar to Aruba and the other islands became special municipalities of the Netherlands. Aruba's right to secede from the Kingdom was not extended to the successors of the Netherlands Antilles, resulting in Aruba remaining the only country that can unilaterally secede.

Countries
The four countries mentioned in the Charter today are the Netherlands, Aruba, Curaçao, and Sint Maarten. The Charter stipulates that the Netherlands is governed according to the provisions of the Constitution for the Kingdom of the Netherlands and that Aruba, Curaçao and Sint Maarten are governed according to their respective Basic Laws.

Constitution
Until 1954 the Constitution for the Kingdom of the Netherlands was the leading document of the Kingdom. It remains, however, the document in which, according to Article 5 of the Charter, the institutions of the Kingdom are regulated.  These institutions, as regulated in the Constitution for the Kingdom of the Netherlands, govern the Netherlands proper. The Charter itself gives additional regulations for these institutions for the purposes of the Kingdom as a whole. The Netherlands is the only one of the four countries which conducts its business internally and externally as the Kingdom of the Netherlands.

Affairs of the Kingdom
The Charter states explicitly which elements of lawmaking and policy that involve Aruba, Curaçao and/or Sint Maarten are to be dealt with on the level of the Kingdom as a whole and are thus valid for all four countries. Any matter not explicitly mentioned to be an affair of the Kingdom that involves Aruba, Curaçao, and/or Sint Maarten is considered to be an affair of the different countries.

Affairs of the Kingdom that do not involve Aruba, Curaçao and/or Sint Maarten are dealt with according to the provisions of the Constitution for the Kingdom of the Netherlands, and in practice by the Netherlands alone in its capacity as the Kingdom of the Netherlands. 

Responsibility for affairs of the Kingdom that involve Aruba, Curaçao and/or Sint Maarten rests with the Council of Ministers of the Kingdom. The affairs of the Kingdom are:

 maintenance of the independence and the defence of the Kingdom;
 foreign relations;
 Netherlands nationality;
 regulation of the orders of chivalry, the flag and the coat of arms of the Kingdom;
 regulation of the nationality of vessels and the standards required for the safety and navigation of seagoing vessels flying the flag of the Kingdom, with the exception of sailing ships;
 supervision of the general rules governing the admission and expulsion of Netherlands nationals and aliens;
 extradition.

Other provisions
In addition, the Charter contains provisions on mutual assistance and co-operation between the four countries. All four countries are, per the Charter, obliged to promote the realisation of human rights and good governance. The Charter can only be amended with the approval of all four countries.

See also
Koninkrijksdag

References

 Website of the Dutch ministry of Internal Affairs
 Charter for the Kingdom of the Netherlands

Politics of the Kingdom of the Netherlands